Satay bee hoon is a dish invented by Singaporean due to cultural fusion between Malay or Javanese with the Teochew people who immigrated to Singapore. Satay bee hoon sauce is a chilli-based peanut sauce very similar to the one served with satay. The satay sauce is spread on top of rice vermicelli.

Ingredient
The main ingredient of satay bee hoon is satay sauce. Cuttlefish, kang kong, bean sprouts, pork slices, prawns and cockles can be added to the vermicelli before spreading the sauce.

See also
Ketoprak, a similar dish from Jakarta, Indonesia, that contains rice vermicelli, rice cake, tofu and beansprouts in peanut sauce. 
Cuisine of Singapore
Peanut sauce
List of peanut dishes
Rice noodles

References

External links
Asian food recipe - satay beehoon recipe

Singaporean cuisine
Chinese noodle dishes
Peanut dishes